When Usenet and e-mail users respond to a message, they often want to include some context for the discussion. This is often accomplished by quoting a portion of the original message using Usenet conventions. In essence the convention is to communicate in plain text format (not HTML) and quote with ">" at the beginning of each line, ">>" for a quote of quote, and so on. Most email clients can perform Usenet quoting automatically.

Examples
Usenet standard quoting refers to the practice of preceding the original message with the ">" (or right-angle bracket) character at the beginning of each line, and then inserting one's responses inline, using no special designator for the author's messages.
> hello, how are you?
I am fine

When a second response is made to the second message, the second message is
again quoting with >, perhaps causing parts of the original message to now be designated with >>.  Such nested quotations can technically be continued indefinitely, but quickly become cumbersome.
>> hello, how are you?
> I am fine
Good, I am also well.

Enhanced quoting (such as facilitating by the Emacs supercite module), includes more context by using the initials or a short form of the name. The
program has to be careful not to quote already quoted material:

first> hello, how are you?

I am fine.

first> hello, how are you?
second> I am fine.

Good, I am also fine.

It is often the case that it makes sense, particularly in the simple quoting case,
to insert a note telling who said what:

Last Saturday, when the sun was nice, Second Guy said:
> Last thursday, while eating popcorn, First Guy said:
>> hello, how are you?
> I am fine
Good, I am also fine.

Canonical quoting
There is no standard declaring one way of quoting to be "right" and others to be "wrong", but some standards depend on conventions. The son-of-1036 draft recommends ">" as the quote-prefix; RFC 3676 depends on it and considers ">> " and "> > " to be semantically different. That is, ">> " has a quote-depth of two, while "> > " has a quote-depth of one, quoting a line starting with ">". For these reasons, ">" is often considered the "canonical" quote-prefix.

See also
 Diple (textual symbol)
 Greater-than sign
 Nested quote
 Top-quoting and other posting styles

Usenet